Anastassiya Lavrova (born 26 July 1995) is a Kazakhstani table tennis player. She competed in the 2020 Summer Olympics.

References

External links
 

1995 births
Living people
Sportspeople from Astana
Table tennis players at the 2020 Summer Olympics
Kazakhstani female table tennis players
Olympic table tennis players of Kazakhstan